Carney Airfield is a former World War II airfield on Guadalcanal, Solomon Islands in the South Pacific.  It is located near Koli Point about six miles from Henderson Field, close to the Metapona River to the east and the Naumbu River to the west.  The airfield was abandoned after the war and today is almost totally returned to its natural state.

History
Also known as Bomber 2 Field, Carney Airfield is named for Captain J.V. Carney, USN a Naval Aviator who was Commanding Officer of Acorn Red One and of Naval Construction Battalion 14 (SeaBees) who was killed 16 December 1942 while taking off from the field, he was the pilot of an SBD Dauntless.

Designed as a fighter airfield, Carney hosted a number of USAAF command organizations and fighter squadrons, along with United States Navy PBY-4 Catalina squadrons.

Units assigned were:
 Headquarters, Thirteenth Air Force, 21 January-15 June 1944
 Headquarters, XIII Bomber Command, 20 August 1943-June 1944
 Headquarters, XIII Fighter Command, December 1943-15 August 1944
 18th Fighter Group, 17 April 1943 – 23 August 1944
 347th Fighter Group, 29 December 1943 – 15 January 1944
 4th Reconnaissance Group, 6 May-12 December 1944
 419th Night Fighter Squadron, 15 November 1943 – 21 August 1944

 VB-106 (PBY-4)
 VMD-254 (PBY-4)
 VB-101 (PB4Y-1)
 VB-102 (PB4Y-1)
 VB-104 (PB4Y-1)

After the war, the airfield was abandoned, and has fallen into a state of disuse.

See also

Koli Airfield
Kukum Field
USAAF in the South Pacific

References

 Maurer, Maurer (1983). Air Force Combat Units Of World War II. Maxwell AFB, Alabama: Office of Air Force History. .
 www.pacificwrecks.com

External links

Airfields of the United States Army Air Forces in the Pacific Ocean theatre of World War II
Airfields of the United States Army Air Forces Air Transport Command in the South West Pacific Theater